Shiba Ali Khan is a Bangladeshi film actress who appears in Dhallywood films. After a successful career as a fashion model, she started her career on television by acting in the drama Rajkumar in October 2012.

Her debut film   released on 28 August 2015.

Career
She started her modelling career at the age of 17 as a runway model. She worked successfully as a model and won "Babisas Award" in 2010 & 2011, "Binodondhara Performance Award" in 2010, "Trab Award" in 2011 as "Best Runway Model" . She also won "DCRU Showbiz Award" in 2011 as a model & actress".

She Started her acting career in 2012 by acting in the drama "Rajkumar".

Her debut film "The Story of Samara" was released in 2015.

Her film Suraiya premiered in Dhaka International Film Festival in 2020.

Her upcoming movies are Operation Agneepath, Encounter, Jamdani etc.

Filmography

As Actress

As Filmmaker

Web

Television

Awards and nominations

See also
 Cinema of Bangladesh

References

External links
 
 

Living people
Bangladeshi film actresses
21st-century Bangladeshi actresses
People from Dhaka
1991 births